Nyagak III Power Station is a  mini hydroelectric power project, under construction in Uganda, the third-largest economy in the East African Community.

Location
The power station is located across the Nyagak River in Nyapea Sub County, Okoro County, Zombo District, in the West Nile sub-region of the  Northern Region of Uganda.

Overview
In September 2010, an Environmental Impact Assessment (EIA) was concluded by Lahmeyer International GmbH, a German consulting engineering firm. The Uganda Electricity Generation Company Limited (UEGCL) would develop Nyagak III through a Public Private Partnership (PPP). In 2013, the International Finance Corporation assisted UEGCL to identify and select an investor from the private sector, who would invest equity and arrange further debt and equity financing for the project. That investor would then design, develop, and operate the development under a PPP agreement with UEGCL. This selection process was expected to last approximately one year, beginning in July 2013. The selected private investor is a consortium consisting of Hydromax Limited and Dott Services Limited. UEGCL and the consortium then formed a special purpose vehicle, Genmax Nyagak Limited, that would build, operate, and manage the power station.

Construction timetable
It was anticipated that the selection process for the core investor would last until 2014. Construction would then begin in 2015 and last three years, with commissioning anticipated in 2018.

Construction costs
In 2011, the construction of Nyagak III Power Station was anticipated to cost approximately US$14 million. The power generated would be evacuated via the existing 33 kilovolt transmission power lines linking the towns of Paidha, Nebbi, Bondo, Okollo, and Arua, constructed at an estimated cost of UGX:44.2 billion (€13 million) between 2013 and 2015 following the development of the Nyagak Power Station. In March 2018, the Daily Monitor reported that KfW had withdrawn a grant of Shs36 billion (€8 million), towards completion of this project, due to extended delay in reaching financial close. The Uganda government will have to source new funding to bridge he gap.

As of March 2019, the construction costs are reported to be US$19.4 million. Loans are being sought from (a) Trade Development Bank (TDB) (b) African Development Bank and (c) Exim Bank of China. TDB is looking at the project with a view of funding it.

In November 2020, the African Export–Import Bank agreed to lend US$10 million towards the completion of this power station, replacing KfW, which withdrew €8 million funding in 2018, due to delays in land acquisition. At the time Afrexim Bank came on board, work progress was estimated at 22 percent completion. Commercial commissioning is anticipated in the fourth quarter of 2022.

Recent developments
In March 2019, the Ugandan Ministry of Energy and Mineral Development, asked UEGCL, expedite the resumption of work on this power station. The SPV company is now called GenVax Nyagak. It is jointly owned by the Ugandan government (30 percent) and a consortium (70 percent) comprising (a) Tata Consulting Engineers (b) Dott Services Limited and (c) Hydromax Limited. The table below illustrates the shareholding in GenVax Nyagak.

As of January 2022 construction was ongoing, with completion anticipated in the second half of 2022.

See also

List of hydropower stations in Africa
List of power stations in Uganda
Nyapea

References

External links
 First solar hydro hybrid plant paused As of 28 January 2020.
 Construction agreement for Nyagak III Hydro Power signed
 West Nile to get 5 megawatts dam

Power stations in Uganda
Zombo District
West Nile sub-region
Northern Region, Uganda
Hydroelectric power stations in Uganda